Binibining Pilipinas 2022 was the 58th edition of Binibining Pilipinas. It took place at the Smart Araneta Coliseum in Quezon City, Metro Manila, Philippines on July 31, 2022.

At the end of the event, Hannah Arnold crowned Nicole Borromeo of Cebu as Binibining Pilipinas International 2022, Cinderella Obeñita crowned Gabrielle Basiano of Borongan, Eastern Samar, as Binibining Pilipinas Intercontinental 2022, Maureen Montagne crowned Chelsea Fernandez of Tacloban as Binibining Pilipinas Globe 2022, Samantha Panlilio crowned Roberta Tamondong of San Pablo, Laguna as Binibining Pilipinas Grand International 2022. Nicole Budol of Angono, Rizal was named 1st Runner-Up, and Stacey Gabriel of Cainta, Rizal was named 2nd Runner-Up.

On August 29, 2022, Wilbert Tolentino, talent manager of Nicole Budol, brought the rights of Miss Planet Philippines. Budol was appointed as Miss Planet Philippines 2022. This was also the last year of Binibining Pilipinas Grand International title to be under Binibining Pilipinas after the franchise of Miss Grand Philippines will be transferred to a new organization.

ABS-CBN broadcast the coronation night via Kapamilya Channel and free-to-air channels A2Z and TV5. The pageant was also simulcast on ABS-CBN's Metro Channel and livestreamed on iWantTFC and YouTube. The competition was hosted by Nicole Cordoves, Catriona Gray, Samantha Bernardo and Edward Barber.

Background

Selection of participants 
40 contestants were chosen during the final screening which was held at the New Frontier Theater last April 22, 2022. On April 25, 2022, the contestants were given their official numbers and was asked what city/province will they represent. The date of their official sashing ceremony will be announced on a later date.

On April 27, 2022, Binibining Pilipinas officially announced the withdrawal of three candidates: Gwendoline Meliz Soriano of Pangasinan, Maria Francesca Taruc of Angeles City, Pampanga, and Iman Franchesca Cristal of Pampanga. The three candidates where then replaced by Patricia Ann Tan, Maria Isabela David, and Joanna Rabe.

Results 
Color keys

  The contestant was a Runner-up in an International pageant.
  The contestant was a Semi-Finalist in an International pageant.

Special awards

Pageant

Format 
Binibining Pilipinas introduced several specific changes to the format for this edition. The number of semifinalists was reduced to 12, compared to 13 in 2021. The results of the closed-door interview and various pageant activities determined the 12 semifinalists selected at large. The 12 semifinalists were tasked to give an opening statement, which was then followed by the swimsuit and evening gown competitions. The 12 semifinalists also competed at the question and answer portion, after which the four titleholders and two runners-up were announced.

Selection committee 

 Cecilio "Cece" Asuncion – Founder and model director, Slay Model Management
 George Barcelon – President, Philippine Chamber of Commerce and Industry
 Ann Colis – Binibining Pilipinas Globe 2015 & Miss Globe 2015
 Jane De Leon – Actress, singer, model, dancer
 Joshua Garcia – Actor, dancer, commercial model
 Rico Hizon – Broadcast journalist and senior news anchor, CNN
 Maria Ahtisa Manalo – Binibining Pilipinas International 2018 & Miss International 2018 1st Runner-Up
 Alfredo Pascual – Secretary, Department of Trade and Industry
 Ioannis Pediotis – Ambassador, Embassy of the Hellenic Republic in the Philippines

Contestants 
40 contestants competed for the four titles.

Notes

References 

2022
2022 beauty pageants
2022 in the Philippines
Beauty pageants in the Philippines